In number theory, a sphenic number (from , 'wedge') is a positive integer that is the product of three distinct prime numbers. Because there are infinitely many prime numbers, there are also infinitely many sphenic numbers.

Definition
A sphenic number is a product pqr where p, q, and r are three distinct prime numbers. In other words, the sphenic numbers are the square-free 3-almost primes.

Examples
The smallest sphenic number is 30 = 2 × 3 × 5, the product of the smallest three primes.
The first few sphenic numbers are
30, 42, 66, 70, 78, 102, 105, 110, 114, 130, 138, 154, 165, ... 

 the largest known sphenic number is 
(282,589,933 − 1) × (277,232,917 − 1) × (274,207,281 − 1).
It is the product of the three largest known primes.

Divisors
All sphenic numbers have exactly eight divisors.

The converse does not hold. For example, 24 is not a sphenic number, but it has exactly eight divisors.

Properties
All sphenic numbers are by definition squarefree, because the prime factors must be distinct.

The Möbius function of any sphenic number is −1.

Any multiple of a sphenic number (except by 1) isn't a sphenic number. This is easily provable by the multiplication process adding another prime factor, or squaring an existing factor.

Consecutive sphenic numbers
The first case of two consecutive sphenic integers is 230 = 2×5×23 and 231 = 3×7×11. The first case of three is 1309 = 7×11×17, 1310 = 2×5×131, and 1311 = 3×19×23. There is no case of more than three, because every fourth consecutive positive integer is divisible by 4 = 2×2 and therefore not squarefree.

The numbers 2013 (3×11×61), 2014 (2×19×53), and 2015 (5×13×31) are all sphenic. The next three consecutive sphenic years will be 2665 (5×13×41), 2666 (2×31×43) and 2667 (3×7×127) .

See also 
 Semiprimes, products of two prime numbers.
 Almost prime

References 

Integer sequences
Prime numbers